Emma Černá (23 March 1937 – 2 July 2018) was a Czech stage, film and television actress.

Upon her graduation from the Academy of Performing Arts, Černá worked at the Theatre on the Balustrade and the Palmovka Theatre. She was also a guest at the Comedy Theatre in Prague and the Prague National Theatre. She has made appearances in almost fifty film or television roles.

References

1937 births
2018 deaths
Czech stage actresses
Czech film actresses
Czech television actresses
People from Mladá Boleslav